Dhuvaran Gas Based CCPP is a power plant , in Anand district in the Indian state of Gujarat. The power plant functions as one of the gas based power plants of Gujarat State Electricity Corporation Limited.

Capacity

References

Natural gas-fired power stations in Gujarat
Anand district
Energy infrastructure completed in 2004
2004 establishments in Gujarat